NGC 2257 is a globular cluster that lies on the outskirts of the Large Magellanic Cloud (LMC). It was discovered in 1834 by John Herschel. The compiler of the New General Catalogue, John Louis Emil Dreyer, described this cluster as "faint, considerably large, round, very gradually a little brighter middle, mottled but not resolved, 17.0 seconds of time diameter." At an aperture of 30.5 arcseconds, its apparent V-band magnitude is 12.62, but at this wavelength, it has 0.12 magnitudes of interstellar extinction.

NGC 2257 is quite old, at about 12.74 billion years old. All else equal, older star clusters have higher mass-to-luminosity ratios; that is, they have lower luminosities for the same mass.

References

External links 
 
 An Ancient Cluster of Stars Against a Stunning Background – ESO Picture of the week.

Globular clusters
2257
Dorado (constellation)
Large Magellanic Cloud